Mount Taipingot lies at the southern end of Songsong Village on the Rota in the Mariana Islands. It is connected to the main part of Rota by a tombolo, on which is the southern part of Songsong village.  It is more commonly known as "Wedding Cake Mountain" because of its resemblance to a layered wedding cake. The areas in and around the mountain are conservation areas established to protect the native flora and fauna that thrive there.

Geography of the Northern Mariana Islands
Tombolos